MMF may refer to:

Medicine
 Mismatch field, a brain response measured in magnetoencephalography
 Mycophenolate mofetil (tradename CellCept), an immunosuppressant drug used to prevent rejection in organ transplantation

Science and technology
 Magnetomotive force
 Methoxymethylfurfural, an intermediate in the production of renewable plastics and biofuels
 Micro-mechanics of failure, a failure theory for fiber reinforced composites
 micro-microfarad, (MMF or μμF), an obsolete unit of capacitance, equivalent to a picofarad
 Multi-mode optical fiber

Computing
 Memory-mapped file, a segment of virtual memory which has been assigned a direct byte-for-byte correlation with some portion of a file or file-like resource
 Minimum Marketable Feature, in software engineering, the smallest set of functionality that must be delivered in order for the customer to perceive value
 .mmf, a file extension used for Synthetic Music Mobile Application Format polyphonic ring tones
 Multimedia Filter, a filter used to reduce Suspended Solids
 Multimedia Fusion and Multimedia Fusion 2, software authoring tools from Clickteam
 Multimedia framework, a software framework that handles media
 Multiple master fonts, a format for fonts

Organizations and events 
 Manitoba Métis Federation
 Masterclass Media Foundation, a UK nonprofit
 Mercy Ministries Foundation, a Christian charitable organization
 Mnet Music Video Festival
 Meredith Music Festival
 Myna Mahila Foundation, an Indian charitable foundation
 Music Managers Forum

Economics and finance 
 Money market fund, an open-ended mutual fund that invests in short-term debt securities such as US Treasury bills and commercial paper
 Master of Mathematical Finance, a degree focusing quantitative analysis and mathematical finance
 Master of Money and Finance, a master's degree offered by the House of Finance at Goethe University Frankfurt, Germany

Other 
 "Make Money Fast!", an email spam that has persisted on the Internet since at least 1988
 Male-male-female, a type of threesome involving two males and one female
 Memphis May Fire, an American metalcore band
 Mamfe Airport, Cameroon (by IATA code)
 Mundat language (by ISO 639 code)